"Stay Awake" is a song by Ronnie Laws. It was released in 1981 as a single from his album Solid Ground.

The song is Laws' only Billboard Hot 100 entry, peaking at No. 60. However, it is a Top 20 hit on the Hot Soul Singles charts, peaking at No. 19.

Chart performance

References

1981 singles
1981 songs
Liberty Records singles